The EMG 85 is a popular active humbucker guitar pickup manufactured by EMG, Inc. It is  paired with the 81 in the Zakk Wylde signature EMG set. It was originally designed to be used in the bridge position but is typically installed in the neck position by modern guitar producers.

The EMG 85 can be recognized by a humbucker form-factor and gold embossed EMG logo.

The EMG 85-7 is the seven string version of the 85.

History and design 

The EMG 85 changed the previous EMG 58 pickup in the EMG product lineup as a popular rhythm pickup. Technologically, EMG 85 is an active humbucker with bar-shaped Alnico 5 magnet. The bar-shaped magnet affects strings uniformly, without irregularities known in more traditional design with separate pole pieces. Alnico 5 magnets also contribute to a warmer tone than that normally associated with ceramic magnets, which is why some players often use the 85 in the bridge, as opposed to the 81.

As the EMG 85 is an active humbucker, its two coils are not just connected in series or parallel with single output. Instead, they have two separate outputs and are summed electronically in the preamp. However, such sealed solution makes it impossible to do coil taps or coil splits. The EMG 89 is a recommended pickup with a coil tap/split option.

As is the case with most other modern EMG pickups, the EMG 85 has a 3-wire quik-connect output, which consists of a 3-pin male connector on the pickup body and a 3-wire cable to connect it. The easy wire color code scheme that is the same for all EMG products simplifies soldering and installation.

18V Mod 
The EMG 85 power source can be modified from 9V to 18V by adding a second 9V battery wired in series. This increases the headroom of the pickup and decreases distortion, particularly with regard to transients. Although the majority of EMG's pickups are rated for 27V operation, they recommend a maximum of 18V, citing the negligible performance increase.

There are two main ways to perform this modification. One method involves using separate battery harnesses for each battery. There are several different ways to achieve this, and wiring diagrams can be found all over the internet. The other involves using a separate 9V snap leading to the control cavity to wire two batteries in series outside of the battery compartment.

Guitars with EMG 85 

 Pensa-Suhr MK1 (EMG SA/SA/85)
 ESP LTD Viper
Esp LTD H1001
 Schecter C-1 Hellraiser
 Schecter Damien Elite and Elite FR
 Schecter Hellraiser Deluxe
 Schecter Omen Extreme
 Steinberger Synapse ST-2FPA
 Jackson Warrior WRXMG [Neck pickup]
 Jackson Dinky DKMG [Neck pickup]
 Jackson SLSMG [Neck pickup] (After July 2006)
 Maxes Harmony Les Paul copy [Neck and Bridge]
 Godin LG EMG
 Godin Freeway EMG
 Godin Redline 2 [Neck Pickup]
 Godin Redline 3 [Neck Pickup]
 Epiphone 1984 Explorer EX [Neck pickup]
 Epiphone Les Paul Custom Plus (Zakk Wylde Bullseye, 2011 edition) [Neck Pickup]
 Epiphone Les Paul Custom EMG
 Epiphone SG prophecy EX
 Epiphone les paul prophecy EX
 Epiphone Limited Edition G-400 Electric Guitar with EMG Pickups
 Dean Guitars Razorback 255
 Dean Guitars Razorback V 255
 Dean Guitars Deceiver
 Dean Guitars Deceiver FG
 Dean Guitars Deceiver FMF
 B.C. Rich Kerry King Signature Wartribe [Neck pickup]
 B.C. Rich Kerry King Signature KKV Flying V [Neck pickup]
 Gibson Les Paul Gothic II kit [Neck Pickup]
 Gibson Custom Zakk Wylde Signature Les Paul [Neck Pickup]
 Gibson Double Cut Longhorn
 Suhr Reb Beach Signature Model [Bridge Pickup]
 Music Man Steve Lukather Signature Model [Bridge Pickup]
 Washburn X50Pro FE  [Bridge Pickup]
 Washburn Wi-200 PRO E
 Washburn Wm24v PRO E
 Washburn Wm526
 Agile AL-2500 EMG Black/Green/Blue [Neck Pickup]
 Agile Reaper Custom Black/White [Neck Pickup]
 Ibanez RGT6EX [Neck Pickup]
 PRS SE Torero [Neck Pickup]
 B.C Rich Asm Pro [Neck Pickup]
 Cort EVL-X7 [Neck Pickup]

References 
 EMG data sheet(an Adobe PDF file)

Guitar pickups